Moorov (Samuel) v HM Advocate (1930 J.C. 68, 1930 S.L.T. 596)(additional citation 1930 J.C. 68) is a famous case in Scots criminal law based on criminal evidence and the admissibility of similar fact evidence. The case established a precedent named the Moorov doctrine.

The Moorov doctrine 
The essential facts of the case are where the accused was an employer who had allegedly committed a string of sexual offences regarding 19 of his female employees over the period of four years, with a total of 21 counts. There was corroboration of evidence available for 3 counts. This case brought light on the original course of similar fact evidence which was generally regarded as inadmissible in court. It created a "course of conduct" which related from a connection of special circumstances, such as recurring sexual offences, similar to the case itself. The course of conduct is sufficient as it determines the use of corroboration for each victim involved.

Principles of the Moorov doctrine
 Series of offences connected  closely in "time, character and circumstance and have underlying unity."
 Evidence of one witness in a series of two or more separate offences capable of providing corroboration for the evidence of a witness in another case or cases.
 Only evidence of the greater charge can corroborate the lesser charge, not vice versa
 Not restricted to sexual assaults
 The time factor can vary- usually not more than 3 years apart, however it may extend to this period in specific circumstances.
 Character of the crime must be the same
 Sodomy and rape are not the same crimes. However, as children were involved Moorov applied
 Incest and sodomy are not the same crimes.

Application of the doctrine
 Distress
 Prior to Lord Advocate’s Reference (No1 of 2001) to prove rape meant proving that intercourse happened against the will of the complainer.
 Rape occurs when a man has intercourse with a woman without her consent
 A victim's distressed state can corroborate rape
 New case law shows that distress is not necessarily enough corroboration, it is a matter of fact meaning it is up to the jury to decide if the distress is enough.

Key cases where the Moorov doctrine was applied
Yates v HM Advocate, 1977
 Accused of raping a 16-year-old girl
 Only witness was a person who testified to the girl's distress shortly after the incident
 Accused admitted intercourse, but said it was consensual
 Found guilty

Gracey v HM Advocate, 1987
 Gracey accused of rape
 Gracey adamant victim was consensual
 Convicted on basis of several witnesses testifying to her distressed state shortly after the incident

Stobo v HM Advocate, 1994
 Indecent assault
 Various witnesses testifying to victim’s distress
 Found guilty even after appeal, it was circumstantial in the same way that torn clothing would be

Smith v Lees
 Overruled Stobo
 13-year-old complained of a sexual assault while camping
 Distress didn’t corroborate that the act had taken place
 They corroborated that something had happened, however it could not be proven that the girl's distress was because of what was claimed to have happened in the tent.

It is found that in incidents where intercourse is admitted and distress is proven, distress can corroborate.

McKearney v HM Advocate, 2004
 Force is no longer part of definition of rape
 Recent distress can’t prove the mens rea of the perpetrator
 Distress may indicate lack of consent, but isn’t evidence that the man knew that/was reckless as to her consent

Cullington v HM Advocate, 1999
 Sexual assault
 Distress was enough to convict, as the jury didn’t believe Cullington’s version that it was consensual

Carloway Review 
"It is acknowledged that the recommendation to remove the requirement for corroboration will attract particular comment and, no doubt, criticism.  There may be further consequences of abolition that will need to be worked through, as the criminal justice system is progressively reformed.  This is the nature of law in society.  But the initial decision, which has to be taken, is whether, of itself, corroboration continues to contribute more than it detracts from a fair, efficient and effective system."

See also 
Pre-trial rights of the accused in Scots law

References 

Scottish criminal case law
1930 in Scotland
1930 in case law
1930 in British law